The discography of Bellini, a German pop girl group, consists of two studio albums, two compilation albums, 11 singles, including 1 as featured artist, 2 promotional singles and 11 music videos. The first Bellini release was the debut studio album Samba de Janeiro in 1997, preceded by the massive chart hit of the same name "Samba de Janeiro", which heavily samples Airto Moreira's 1972 song "Tombo In 7/4" from his album Fingers, also released in 1997. This release was followed with the compilation album Samba de Janeiro - Non-Stop Best of Bellini and the sophomore studio album Festival in 2001 and 2014.

Albums

Studio albums

Compilation albums

Singles

Promotional singles

Featured singles

Music videos

Notes

References

Discographies of German artists